Lat Bua Luang is a district (amphoe) in the southern part of Ayutthaya province, central Thailand.

History
Tambon Lat Bua Luang was separated from Amphoe Bang Sai and officially upgraded to a district in 1947.

Geography
Neighboring districts are (from the north clockwise) Bang Sai (บางซ้าย), Sena, and Bang Sai (บางไทร) of Ayutthaya Province, Sam Khok and Lat Lum Kaeo of Pathum Thani province, Sai Noi of Nonthaburi province, Bang Len of Nakhon Pathom province, and Song Phi Nong of Suphanburi province.

Administration
The district is divided into seven sub-districts (tambon). Lat Bua Luang is a township (thesaban tambon) covering parts of the tambon Lat Bua Luang.

Lat Bua Luang